Jorge Luis Espejo Miranda (born 20 August 1976) is a Peruvian football manager and former player who played as a midfielder.

Playing career
Born in Lima, Espejo made his senior debut with Sport Boys in 1995. After spending the following year on loan at fellow top-tier side Guardia Republicana, he went on to establish himself as a regular in the Rosados, before moving to Alianza Lima in 2000.

Espejo returned to Sport Boys in 2001, but only remained a year and subsequently signed for FBC Melgar. He then represented Unión Huaral and Universidad San Martín before rejoining Sport Boys for a third spell in 2006.

In 2007, Espejo agreed to a deal with newcomers Total Clean. He rejoined Sport Boys for a fourth period in 2008, before returning to his previous club in 2009, now called Total Chalaco; he retired with the latter in the end of the campaign, aged 33.

Managerial career
Shortly after retiring, Espejo began his managerial career in 2010 while in charge of Deportivo Coopsol. He narrowly missed out promotion in the following year, and subsequently left the club.

In May 2012, Espejo was named manager of Cobresol after the departure of Teddy Cardama, but only as an interim manner, as the club later appointed Javier Chirinos as manager; Espejo was named in charge of the youth setup. On 18 September of that year, he was appointed manager of former club Sport Boys.

Despite suffering relegation, Espejo continued in charge of the club for the 2013 campaign, but resigned on 8 July 2013. On 19 August 2013, he was named Daniel Ahmed's assistant at Sporting Cristal for the 2014 campaign, before taking over Cienciano on 23 December 2014.

On 1 October 2015, Espejo left Cienciano due to the club's financial problems, and was named in charge of Real Garcilaso on 17 December. Sacked the following 1 May, he worked for Cantolao's youth setup before being appointed manager of Comerciantes Unidos.

Espejo subsequently returned to Cantolao's youth sides for the 2018 campaign, and was appointed manager of another former side, Unión Huaral, on 28 January 2019. On 28 October 2020, he rejoined Cantolao for a third spell, but now as a first team manager.

References

External links

1976 births
Living people
Footballers from Lima
Peruvian footballers
Association football midfielders
Sport Boys footballers
Club Alianza Lima footballers
FBC Melgar footballers
Unión Huaral footballers
Club Deportivo Universidad de San Martín de Porres players
Total Chalaco footballers
Peruvian football managers
Peruvian Primera División managers
Coronel Bolognesi managers
Alianza Atlético managers
Sport Boys managers
Peruvian Primera División players
Academia Deportiva Cantolao managers
Cusco FC managers